Hoppy the Marvel Bunny is a fictional comic book superhero and anthropomorphic animal originally published by Fawcett Comics as a spin-off of Captain Marvel. He was created by Chad Grothkopf (1914–2005), and debuted in Fawcett's Funny Animals #1 (December 1942). Hoppy later became a property of DC Comics, and has made periodic appearances in stories related to Captain Marvel, today also known as Shazam or The Captain.

Publication history
In 1942, Fawcett Comics, decided to add a cartoon animal comic book to accompany its line of superhero, action, and adventure comics. Chad Grothkopf, an artist with experience at DC Comics and Timely Comics, was tapped to come up with concepts for Fawcett's Funny Animals comic; his creations included Willie the Worm, Shelock Monk and Chuck, and Hoppy, a rabbit who dreamed of being strong. For the latter character, Grothkopf added elements from Fawcett's popular Captain Marvel strips, and the lead strip for Funny Animals was set as Hoppy the Marvel Bunny.

Hoppy debuted in Fawcett's Funny Animals #1, and appears in nearly every issue of that comic's run. He also starred in his own 15-issue series, Hoppy the Marvel Bunny (December 1945 – September 1947), which featured several Hoppy stories per issue, along with stories featuring his old co-stars from Fawcett's Funny Animals. One of his foes is Captain Black Bunny, the lagomorph equivalent of Captain Marvel's foe Black Adam.

Hoppy's stories include "Hoppy the Marvel Bunny and the Paper Dolls of Victory!", "The Keepers of the Winds" and "Hoppy Duels with Stinger Bee".

For a span of five issues (#49–54, May–October 1947), Hoppy made no appearances in Fawcett's Funny Animals; these issues featured Billy the Kid and Oscar as the lead feature. Beginning with #55, Hoppy returned as the main feature. 

In Fawcett's Funny Animals #69 (February 1951), the Captain Marvel Bunny stories were dropped, replaced by more standard talking-animal stories with just Hoppy. There was no further mention of his career as Captain Marvel Bunny. In issue #80 the word "Fawcett's" was dropped from the title, making the remaining issues simply Funny Animals. The final issue of Funny Animals was #83 (1953).

After Fawcett cancelled Funny Animals, the rights to many of its characters were purchased by Charlton Comics. Charlton resumed publication of "Funny Animals" with #84 and continued the series to #91 (February 1956). Hoppy also appeared in Charlton's Atomic Mouse, though these stories appear to be edited reprints from Fawcett's Funny Animals. For these reprints, Charlton removed the lightning bolt from Marvel Bunny's suit and recolored the costume, changing his name to Magic Bunny and his magic word to "Alizam!". He is alternately referred to in various Charlton books as "Hoppy", "Happy", "Happy the Magic Bunny" and, according to one source, "Speedy".

After the Fawcett characters were purchased by DC Comics, Hoppy returned in DC Comics Presents #34 (June 1981). Hoppy has turned up sporadically since, primarily in Captain Carrot and His Amazing Zoo Crew! in The Oz-Wonderland War #2, in The Power of Shazam! #29, and in Tiny Titans #15. A modernized version of Hoppy has made a handful of appearances in the revamped New 52/DC Rebirth interpretation of Shazam!, beginning in 2012.

Fictional character biography
Hoppy is a pink rabbit who lives in the town of Funny Animalville, along with an assortment of other funny animal characters. As revealed in the origin story from Fawcett's Funny Animals #1, Hoppy is a fan of Captain Marvel. One day, he decides to emulate his hero and speaks the magic word "Shazam!" Surprisingly, the magic word transforms Hoppy into Captain Marvel Bunny.

In Fawcett's Funny Animals #30 (July 1945), an explanation for Hoppy's powers is revealed. In the story "Hoppy Meets the Wizard Bunny", Hoppy is hit on the head and develops amnesia. The mysterious Wizard Bunny (or Bunny Wizard, both versions are used) is watching, and he flies down to help Hoppy regain his memory. A panel in this story states: "Because it was he who bestowed the magic word and power upon Hoppy, the Bunny Wizard flies down to Earth to help Hoppy". Eventually, the Wizard gets Hoppy to say "Shazam!" and his memory is restored, along with his abilities. This is the Bunny Wizard's only known appearance.

The word "Shazam!" has a slightly different meaning for Hoppy. According to the E. Nelson Bridwell-scripted story, Captain Carrot and His Amazing Zoo Crew! in The Oz-Wonderland War #2, Captain Marvel Bunny has the wisdom of Salamander, the strength of Hogules, the stamina of Antlers, the power of Zebreus, the courage of Abalone, and the speed of Monkury.

Hoppy's stories occasionally feature his girlfriend Millie, who (like Lois Lane) despises the meek Hoppy, but adores the heroic Captain Marvel Bunny. Millie has no idea that Hoppy can become Captain Marvel Bunny. 
 
A noteworthy foe appeared in Fawcett's Funny Animals #32 (Oct–Nov 1945). In the lead story of that issue, Hoppy faces Captain Black Bunny, who is based on Captain Marvel's foe Black Adam. Captain Black Bunny wears a black costume similar to Black Adam's, though the evil bunny wears a cape like Hoppy and instead of a lightning bolt he has a yellow flame on his chest. Captain Black Bunny comes from deep within the Earth's core and is aided by a gang of imps. 
 
In Hoppy's first appearance in DC Comics (in DC Comics Presents #34), Hoppy and Millie find themselves magically transported to Earth-S, the home of the Marvel Family in the Pre-Crisis DC Universe. He aids the Marvel Family and Superman against Mr. Mind, Mr. Mxyzptlk, and King Kull. In this story, both Hoppy and Millie were depicted as white bunnies, instead of their usual pink.

Hoppy next appears in Captain Carrot and His Amazing Zoo Crew! in The Oz-Wonderland War #2 (1986), where he fights alongside the Zoo Crew. His silhouette is briefly seen in Limbo, where forgotten characters from DC continuity currently reside, pursued by Ace the Bat-Hound, during the events of Final Crisis in 2009.

Following DC's 2011 New 52 reboot, Hoppy was reimagined as the pet of Mary Bromfield in the rebooted Shazam! franchise. In Shazam! #1 (February 2019), Hoppy is accidentally struck by magic lightning when Mary and her foster sister Darla Dudley say "Shazam!" and assume their superhero forms. As a result, Hoppy acquires superpowers (flight and lightning-emitting eyes, among others) and his fur pattern reflects the lightning-bolt emblem of the Shazam Family.

Powers and abilities
Hoppy has powers roughly similar to those of Captain Marvel/Shazam. He accesses his powers by yelling "Shazam!", but his pantheon differs. His patron deities are Salamander, Hogules, Antlers, Zebreus, Abalone and Monkury.

Reception
In American Comic Book Chronicles: 1940-1944, Kurt Mitchell and Roy Thomas wrote: "It was cover star Hoppy the Marvel Bunny who made FFA special. Creator Chad Grothkopf struck a balance in his stories between the usual cartoon animal tropes, fairy tale-style fantasy, and full-tilt super-heroics, the strip's only sticking point the tiresome gimmick of Hoppy never being able to remember his magic word. Whether battling piscine pirate Captain Kid Perch, the Witch, King Artist of Picture Land, or Simon Spider and his living dolls, Marvel Bunny always delivered big laughs and plenty of action".

See also
Captain Carrot
Thunderbunny

References

External links 
Hoppy the Marvel Bunny at Don Markstein's Toonopedia. Archived from the original on April 9, 2012.
Earth-S Marvel Family Index 

Golden Age superheroes
Animal superheroes
Anthropomorphic rabbits and hares
Comics about rabbits and hares
Comics about animals
Comics characters introduced in 1942
DC Comics characters who can move at superhuman speeds
DC Comics characters with superhuman strength
DC Comics superheroes
DC Comics animals
Marvel Family
1942 comics debuts